A konfederacja ("confederation") was an ad hoc association formed by Polish–Lithuanian szlachta (nobility), clergy, cities, or military forces in the Polish–Lithuanian Commonwealth for the attainment of stated aims. A konfederacja often took the form of an armed rebellion aimed at redressing perceived abuses or trespasses of some (e.g. royal) authority. Such "confederations" acted in lieu of state authority or to force their demands upon that authority. They could be seen as a primary expression of direct democracy and right of revolution in the Commonwealth, and as a way for the nobles to act on their grievances and against the state's central authority.

History and function
In the late 13th century, confederations of cities, aiming to support public safety and provide security from rampant banditry, appeared, with the first confederation being that of several towns (Poznań, Pyzdry, Gniezno and Kalisz in Greater Poland) in 1298. In the mid-14th century, confederations of nobility, directed against the central authorities, emerged, with the first such confederation being that of 1352. During interregnums, confederations (essentially vigilance committees) formed to replace the inactive royal court, protect internal order, and defend the country from external dangers. The confederations, as a right of revolution, were recognized in Polish law through the Henrician articles (1573), part of the pacta conventa sworn by every Polish king since 1576. They stated (in the articulus de non praestanda oboedientia, a rule dating to 1501 from Privilege of Mielnik) that if the monarch did not recognize or abused the rights and privileges of the nobility (szlachta), the nobles would no longer be bound to obey him and would have the legal right to disobey him.

With the beginning of the 17th century, confederations became an increasingly significant element of the Commonwealth's political scene. In the 17th and 18th centuries, confederations were organized by magnates, and were either pro- or anti-royal. A confederation not recognized by the king was considered a rokosz ("rebellion"), although some of the rokosz would be eventually recognized by the king, who could even join them himself. Most pro-royal confederations were usually formed as a response to an anti-royal one, and some would take a form of an extraordinary session of the parliament (sejm), as happened in 1710, 1717 and 1735.

Confederations where usually formed in one part of the country, and could expand into "general confederations" taking in most or all of the voivodeships of the Polish–Lithuanian Commonwealth. However, even such general confederations would be formed separately for the Crown of the Kingdom of Poland and for the Grand Duchy of Lithuania.

Each confederation had a key document explaining its goals, known as the act of the confederation, which was deposited with the court (usually the local court for the region the confederation was formed). Additional resolutions of the confederates, known as sanctia, would also be deposited with the court. Membership of the confederation was voluntary, and required an oath. The executive branch of a confederation was headed by a marshal, and a group of advisers, each known as konsyliarz konfederacji. A marshal and associated konsyliarze were known as a generality (generalność). A confederation would also have a larger council, similar to a parliament (walna rada), which made decisions by majority vote. Until around the mid-18th century, resolutions of the council had to be unanimous, but afterwards, majority voting became more common. The chief military commanders of confederations were known as regimentarze.

Also in the 18th century an institution known as a "confederated sejm" evolved. It was a parliament session (sejm) that operated under the rules of a confederation. Its primary purpose was to avoid being subject to disruption by the liberum veto, unlike the national Sejm, which was paralyzed by the veto during this period. On some occasions, a confederated sejm was formed from the whole membership of the national Sejm, so that the liberum veto would not operate there.

Confederations were proscribed by law in 1717, but continued to operate, indicating a weakness of the Commonwealth's central authority. They were also abolished by the Constitution of May 3, 1791 (adopted by the Four-Year Sejm of 1788–1792, itself a confederated sejm). But in practice this prohibition was not observed. The May 3rd Constitution was overthrown in mid-1792, by the Targowica Confederation of Polish magnates backed by Russian Empire and eventually joined, under extreme duress, by King Stanisław II August. The ensuing Russian military intervention led (to the Confederates' surprise) to the Second Partition of Poland in 1793. In 1812 the General Confederation of the Kingdom of Poland was formed in Warsaw to Napoleon I's campaign against the Russian Empire.

List of confederations
Some confederations from Polish history included:
 a confederation of towns in Greater Poland in 1298, aiming to provide public safety, recreated in 1302;
 a confederation of towns in Silesia in 1311, aiming to provide public safety;
 a confederation of towns from 1349–1350, aiming to provide public safety;
 Confederation of Maciej Borkowic in Greater Poland, opposing the disliked starost Wierzbięta of Paniewice (1352–1358);
 Confederation of Bartosz of Odolanowo, formed in Radom, aiming to provide security for the period of interregnum following the death of king Louis I (1382);
 a confederation in Radom, formed by magnates, nobility and town, in support of Queen Jadwiga;
 Piotrków Confederation, during a dispute about clergy's right to collect tithe (1406–1407);
 Wieluń Confederation, supporting the king against the Hussite invasion (1423–1424);
 Sieradz Confederation and Korczyn Confederation (1438);
 Confederation of Spytek of Melsztyn supporting the Hussites (1439);
 Prussian Confederation of Prussian towns, formed in Kwidzyn, against the Teutonic Order;
 Lwów Confedeeration of the town and the nobility against a disliked official;
 Chicken War (1537);
 Warsaw Confederation, formed in Sejm (1573);
 Zebrzydowski Rebellion (1605);
 Tyszowce Confederation military and nobility against the Swedish invasion (1655);
 Lubomirski's Rokosz (1665–1666);
 Szczebrzesz Confederation against the election of Michał Korybut Wiśniowiecki (1672);
 Gołąb Confederation for the election of Michał Korybut Wiśnowiecki (1673);
 Starogard Confederation supporting Sweden (1703–1709);
 Greater Poland Confederation (Wielkopolska Confederation) (1703);
 Opatów Confederation and Warsaw Confederation, both formed against the Saxon king Augustus II of Poland (1704);
 Sandomierz Confederation formed in support of the Saxon king Augustus II of Poland (1704);
 Gorzyce Confederation and Tarnogród Confederation, both formed against the Saxon king Augustus II of Poland (1715);
 Grudziądz Confederation supporting Stanisław Leszczyński (1733–1734);
 Kolbuszowa Confederation supporting Stanisław Leszczyński (1734);
 Dzików Confederation supporting Stanisław Leszczyński (1734);
 Wilno Confederation formed by Czaroryski family against Karol Stanisław "Panie Kochanku" Radziwiłł (1764);
 Słuck Confederation formed by Greek Orthodox believers, demanding the restoration of rights (1767);
 Toruń Confederation (Thorn Confederation) formed by Protestant believers, demanding the restoration of rights (1767);
 Radom Confederation formed by the religious minorities (dissidents) in support of Karol Stanisław "Panie Kochanku" Radziwiłł (1767);
 Bar Confederation formed by opponents of king Stanisław August Poniatowski, Russian Empire and the religious minorities (1768–1772);
 Targowica Confederation formed by conservatives opposing the Constitution of 3 May (1792–1793);
 Grodno Confederation (1793); and
 General Confederation of the Kingdom of Poland, formed in Warsaw, in support of Napoleon I and against the Russian Empire (1812–1813).

See also
 Sejmik
 Golden Liberty
Thing
Private defence agency

References